The 2020 Chinese Football Association Division Two League season was the 31st season since its establishment in 1989. The season was scheduled to begin on 14 March and end on 17 October 2020, but was postponed following the coronavirus pandemic in China. On 12 October 2020, Chinese Football Association announced that the season would be resumed on 24 October 2020. In this season, 21 teams were split into two groups.

Team changes

To League Two
Teams promoted from 2019 Chinese Champions League
 Nanjing Fengfan
 Shenzhen Bogang
 Xi'an UKD
 Shanghai Jiading Boji
 Qingdao Zhongchuang Hengtai

From League Two
Teams promoted to 2020 China League One
 Shenyang Urban
 Chengdu Better City
 Taizhou Yuanda
 Suzhou Dongwu
 Jiangxi Liansheng
 Sichuan Jiuniu
 Kunshan F.C.

Disqualified or dissolved entries
 Baoding Yingli ETS
 Dalian Chanjoy
 Fujian Tianxin
 Hangzhou Wuyue Qiantang
 Jilin Baijia
 Lhasa Urban Construction Investment
 Nanjing Shaye
 Shenzhen Pengcheng
 Yanbian Beiguo
 Yinchuan Helanshan

Heze Caozhou and Nanjing Balanta gained entries to 2020 China League Two but both withdrew before the season starts.

Name changes
 Shanxi Metropolis F.C. changed their name to Shanxi Longjin in March 2020.

Clubs

Stadiums and Locations

Clubs Locations

Managerial changes

Group A

League table

Results

Positions by round

Results by match played

Group B

League table

Results

Positions by round

Results by match played

Promotion play-offs

Overview

First leg

Second leg

Zibo Cuju won 2–0 on aggregate.

Wuhan Three Towns won 2–1 on aggregate.

3rd–4th place playoff

Overview

Match

Final

Overview

Match

Relegation play-offs

Overview

First leg

Second leg

Jiangsu Yancheng Dingli won 3–1 on aggregate.

Top scorers

References

External links

3
China League Two seasons